The 24th Directors Guild of America Awards, honoring the outstanding directorial achievements in film and television in 1971, were presented in 1972.

Winners and nominees

Film

Television

Outstanding Television Director
 John Rich

External links
 

Directors Guild of America Awards
1971 film awards
1971 television awards
Direct
Direct
Directors